The Calvert Mill/Washington Mill, also known as the Old Mill, is an historic water-powered grinding mill located on Old Mill Road in Washington, Virginia. Its water source is the Rush River. The Calvert name comes from George Calvert, Jr., a local landowner, who owned it from 1779 to 1800. The oldest part of the present mill dates from this period. Later additions were made in 1840 and 1860. It was bought in 1979 by Peter Kramer, who planned to restore it. As of 2008, though, it stood unused and in disrepair.

On September 2, 1982, it was added to the National Register of Historic Places.

References

Washington, Virginia
Grinding mills in Virginia
Watermills in the United States
Buildings and structures in Rappahannock County, Virginia
Industrial buildings completed in 1860
Grinding mills on the National Register of Historic Places in Virginia
National Register of Historic Places in Rappahannock County, Virginia